NSPCL (NTPC-SAIL Power Company Limited) is a joint venture of National Thermal Power Corporation and Steel Authority of India Limited. engaged in power generation primarily to meet the captive power requirement of various steel plants of SAIL throughout India. It is one of the institutional category III profit making Indian PSEs.

History
NTPC and SAIL joined forces in March 2001 and took over a captive power plant (consisting of 2x60MW generators) located at the Durgapur Steel Plant and another (also 2x60 MW) at the Rourkela Steel Plant.

NTPC formed another joint venture company with SAIL on in March 2002 in the name of Bhilai Electric Supply Company Ltd. (BESCL). BESCL took over a captive power plant (comprising 2x 30 MW generators and one 14MW back-power turbo generator) located at the Bhilai Steel Plant from SAIL.  Effective 11 September 2006, BESCL became part of NSPCL.

Growth
Since 2006, NSPCL has provided all power required by the Bhilai, Durgapur and Rourkela steel plants. To meet growing demands, NSPCL commissioned an expansion project at Bhilai comprising two 250 MW generators during 2008–2009, and brought the units online in 2009–2010.  From the expansion plant, NSPCL is supplying power to the beneficiaries viz. Union Territory of Dadra & Nagar Haveli, Union Territory of Daman & Diu, Chhattishgarh and Bhilai Steel Plant / SAIL in the western region.
Total installed capacity of NSPCL and projects are as follows

Projects Under Construction 
Following projects are under construction at Rourkela and Durgapur to meet the captive power requirement of Rourkela and Durgapur steel plants respectively.

Proposed Projects 
The company is also expecting further capacity addition at various units of SAIL.

References 

Electric-generation companies of India
Steel Authority of India
Indian companies established in 2001
2001 establishments in Delhi
Companies based in Delhi